The chief investment officer (CIO) is a job title for the board level head of investments within an organization.  The CIO's purpose is to understand, manage, and monitor their organization's portfolio of assets, devise strategies for growth, act as the liaison with investors, and recognize and avoid serious risks, including those never before encountered.

Usage in the United States of America
According to a press release on October 22, 2008, the United States Department of the Treasury named James H. Lambright to serve as the interim chief investment officer for the Troubled Asset Relief Program. "He will provide counsel to Secretary Henry M. Paulson, Jr. and Interim Assistant Secretary for the Office of Financial Stability Neel Kashkari as they develop and implement the program."

Whenever the role of the chief investment officer is active within an insurance company (either life or non-life) and/or pension fund, the role is to manage and coordinate the investment, liquidity (treasury) and/or asset and liability management in order to optimize investment performance within the risk appetite as defined by actuarial studies of risk management guidelines. The role of a chief investment officer within a corporate pension organization is similar, although the end-goal for the chief investment officer is often not profit, but matching the organization's pension assets with its pension liabilities. Chief investment officers at endowments and foundations also consider the liabilities of the organization, with an added focus on liquidity and alternative assets.

Outsourcing models

Background 
Jonathan Hirtle, Chief Executive Officer for Hirtle, Callaghan & Co., pioneered the outsourced chief investment officer (OCIO) model, which serves family groups and organizations that do not employ fully staffed investment departments. For his OCIO innovations, Hirtle has been dubbed the “"Oracle of Outsource".

Current OCIO models 
The model by which outsourced CIOs service clients is still evolving in this nascent business.  The most common model is to outsource all decision-making including asset allocation, manager selection and monitoring.  The OCIO reports back to the client, but the burden is largely lifted from the client and placed on the new provider.  Among OCIOs utilizing this approach, there is a "continuum of outsourcing approaches and providers: manager-of-manager programs; funds-of-funds; former CIOs offering a diversified model portfolio".  The common thread amongst these approaches is the use of commingled funds or model portfolios which creates economies of scale for the OCIO.

A different model is pursued by a small subset of the OCIO universe.  The members of this group work alongside the client's staff – not as a replacement to them.  According to investment industry newsletter FundFire, "An increasing number of CIOs see outsourcing not as a threat to their job, but as a source of complementary expertise and advice, as well as investment opportunities."  Like much of the nomenclature around the OCIO business, this more customized, bespoke solution does not yet have a widely recognized name.  Fiduciary Research (FRC), an OCIO who oversees about $9 billion on behalf of a small list of pension fund clients, calls itself an iCIO for integrated chief investment office.

See also

 Chief information officer

References

Finance occupations

Management occupations